The Peedee Formation is a geologic formation in North and South Carolina. A marine deposit, named for exposures along the Great Peedee River, it preserves belemnites and foraminifera fossils dating from the Late Cretaceous. The formation is notable for its occurrence of Belemnitella americana, known as the Pee Dee Belemnite (PDB), a long-standing standard in stable carbon isotope research.

See also 

 List of fossiliferous stratigraphic units in South Carolina
 List of fossiliferous stratigraphic units in North Carolina

References

External links 
 

Cretaceous geology of North Carolina
Cretaceous geology of South Carolina